Sailendra Nath Manna (1 September 1924 – 27 February 2012), known popularly as Sailen Manna, was an Indian football player who represented the India national team between 1948 and 1956. Predominantly played as a left-back, Manna is considered as one of the best defenders the country has ever produced. He has represented and captained India in different international competitions, including the Olympics and Asian Games.

He also has represented Mohun Bagan in club football, one of the oldest clubs in India, for a continuous period of 19 years. Manna was the only Asian footballer to be named among the ten best Captains in the world by the English FA in 1953.

Education
Manna graduated from the Surendranath College, an affiliated college of the University of Calcutta. He worked for the Geological Survey of India.

Club career
Manna started his playing career with Howrah Union, then a club in the second Division of the Kolkata Football League, in 1940. After turning out for the club for a couple of seasons, he joined Mohun Bagan in 1942 and continued playing for the club till his retirement in 1960. Between 1950 and 1955, he featured as the club's captain. During his 19-year association with the club as player, he reportedly earned only 19. Speaking to Sportstar in 2006, he reasoned that he "played out of love for the sport and was happy with the salary I got from my employer, the Geological Survey of India."

As a defender, Manna was known for his anticipation, covering and a strong free kick. He also represented Bengal football team in Santosh Trophy and played alongside Sheoo Mewalal, winning the tournament in 1953–54 season defeating Mysore 3–1 in final. He was also part of Bengal's multiple Santosh Trophy wins under coaching of Balaidas Chatterjee.

International career
Manna was part of the India national team managed by Balaidas Chatterjee that participated at the 1948 Summer Olympics in London. He went to Europe with the national team in July to play preparatory matches against English teams like Pinner F.C., Hayes F.C. and Alexandra Park FC before the main tournament. In the Olympics, their first match was against Burma, and it was a walkover. Then, they played their one and only match against France, and was defeated by a margin of 1–2 with Indian goal coming from Sarangapani Raman. Manna played in the tournament in bare feet; their bravery earned admiration of Princess Margaret of England. With India, he later went on to play few friendly matches with captain Talimeren Ao in their Nederlands tour, where they went down to Sparta Rotterdam but won 5–1 against Ajax Amsterdam.

Under his captaincy, India won the gold medal in the 1951 Asian Games, and also won the Quadrangular Tournament for four consecutive years from 1952 to 1956. In 1953, the England Football Association rated him among the ten best skippers of the world in its yearbook. Manna was also the captain of the Syed Abdul Rahim managed Indian team in 1952 Helsinki Olympics and a member of the 1954 Asian Games. The 1952 Summer Olympics in Helsinki was not suitable for his team as they tasted a defeat of 10–1 to Yugoslavia.

Manna used to keep a picture of the Hindu deity Kali, tucked away in his pocket. Two of his greatest regrets in life are missing the first penalty kick against France in the London Olympics, and turning down the chance of taking the second penalty because he was afraid of missing again, and India had not gone to the 1950 FIFA World Cup in Brazil, with him as captain, because the Indian Football Federation had not realized its importance.

He hung up his boots on 27 August 1960 after playing in India's international charity match against Indonesia in New Delhi.

Managerial career
After retiring from football, Manna went on to become head coach of India at the 1961 Merdeka Cup in Malaysia, in which he guided some of India's notable players like Jarnail Singh, P. K. Banerjee, Peter Thangaraj and Tulsidas Balaram. He also managed the national team in 1968 Merdeka Cup. He later became team official of Mohun Bagan and went with Karuna Bhattacharya managed team to newly independent Bangladesh in May 1972, where they defeated Dhaka Mohammedan in first match, but lost to Shadhin Bangla football team in their last match.

Death

After being unwell for quite some time, Manna died at a private hospital in Kolkata on Monday, 27 February 2012. He was 87 years old and was survived by his wife and daughter.

Legacy

Mohun Bagan Athletic Club began giving the "Sailen Manna Memorial Award for best sportsperson" in memory of him.

In 2013, Howrah Municipal Corporation Stadium, which was one of the venues of the 2006 AFC Youth Championship, was renamed as Sailen Manna Stadium by the HMC in honour of him. In March 2020, Chief Minister of West Bengal Mamata Banerjee announced the renaming of Dumurjola Indoor Stadium as Sailen Manna Indoor Stadium.

Honours

India
Asian Games Gold medal: 1951
 Colombo Cup: 1952, 1953, 1954

Mohun Bagan
CFL 1st Division: 1944, 1951, 1954, 1955, 1956, 1959, 1960, 1962, 1963, 1964, 1965
Durand Cup: 1953, 1953, 1959, 1960, 1963, 1964, 1965
IFA Shield: 1947, 1948, 1952, 1954, 1956, 1960, 1961, 1962
Rovers Cup: 1955, 1956

Bengal
Santosh Trophy: 1945–46, 1947–48, 1949–50, 1950–51, 1951–52, 1953–54, 1955–56, 1958–59, 1959–60, 1962–63

Individual
Included in the list of the 10 best Captains of the world by English FA in 1953.
Awarded the  Padma Shri in 1971 by the Government of India.
Awarded the "Footballer of the Millennium" by All India Football Federation in 2000.
Awarded "Mohun Bagan Ratna" in 2001.
Awarded Banga Bibhushan in 2011 by the Government of West Bengal

See also

 History of Indian football
 List of India national football team managers
 History of the India national football team
 List of India national football team captains
 India national football team at the Olympics

References

Bibliography

External links
 
 
 Obituary - The Economist

1924 births
2012 deaths
Asian Games medalists in football
Association football defenders
Footballers at the 1948 Summer Olympics
Footballers at the 1951 Asian Games
Footballers at the 1952 Summer Olympics
Footballers at the 1954 Asian Games
Footballers from West Bengal
Mohun Bagan AC players
Indian footballers
India international footballers
Olympic footballers of India
People from Howrah
Medalists at the 1951 Asian Games
Recipients of the Padma Shri in sports
Surendranath College alumni
University of Calcutta alumni
Asian Games gold medalists for India
Indian football managers
India national football team managers
Calcutta Football League players